Bjørn Olav Heidenstrøm (born 15 January 1968) is a Norwegian former professional footballer who played as a midfielder. He represented Norway internationally at youth levels U15, U16 and U19.

After the end of his professional career, he worked administratively for the football club Vålerenga. He also attained fame after being featured in several iterations of Championship Manager, a football-management simulation video game series.

In June 2009, Heidenstrøm embarked on a journey by bicycle from Norway to Cape Town, South Africa, to raise awareness for the plight of refugees. Along the way he collected football shirts, which were stitched together to form a huge football shirt that was unveiled at the 2010 FIFA World Cup in South Africa in June 2010.

References

External links
 
 Official Site The Shirt 2010

1968 births
Living people
Sportspeople from Porsgrunn
Norwegian footballers
Association football midfielders
Norway youth international footballers
English Football League players
Odds BK players
Lillestrøm SK players
Sogndal Fotball players
Drøbak-Frogn IL players
Bærum SK players
Leyton Orient F.C. players
Norwegian expatriate footballers
Norwegian expatriate sportspeople in England
Expatriate footballers in England